The Roman Catholic Diocese of Cruz das Almas is located in the city of Cruz das Almas, Bahia, Brazil.  It is a suffragan see to the Archdiocese of São Salvador da Bahia.

History
On 22 November 2017, Pope Francis established the Diocese of Cruz das Almas from the Archdiocese of São Salvador da Bahia.

Ordinaries
Antônio Tourinho Neto (22 Nov 2017–present)

References

Roman Catholic dioceses in Brazil
Christian organizations established in 2017
Roman Catholic Ecclesiastical Province of São Salvador da Bahia
Roman Catholic dioceses and prelatures established in the 21st century